Hugo Bueno Sánchez (born February 16, 1992, in Colima City, Colima) is a Mexican former professional footballer who played as a midfielder.

External links
 
 Ascenso MX

Living people
1992 births
People from Colima City
Association football midfielders
Chiapas F.C. footballers
Venados F.C. players
Footballers from Colima
Mexican footballers
21st-century Mexican people